The Haidian River  runs through Haikou City, separating the main part of and its northern part Haidian Island, in Hainan province. Its tributary is the Nandu River.

There are three bridges that cross the river:
Haikou Century Bridge near the mouth of the Haidian River at Haikou Bay.
Renmin Bridge crosses a narrow section of the Haidian River linking Changdi Road with Renmin Avenue.
Heping Bridge connects Changdi Road and Heping Avenue across the Haidian River.

Haikou New Port is located on the south bank of this river.

Gallery

See also
List of rivers in China

References

External links

 Images

Rivers of Hainan
Haikou